Stepan Vladislavovich Surikov (born 30 January 2002) is a Russian football player. He plays for FC Salyut Belgorod on loan from FC Rubin Kazan.

Club career
He was first called up to the senior squad of FC Rubin Kazan in November 2020. He made his debut in the Russian Premier League for Rubin on 13 September 2021 in a game against FC Ural Yekaterinburg.

Career statistics

References

External links
 
 
 

2002 births
Sportspeople from Izhevsk
Living people
Russian footballers
Russia youth international footballers
Association football midfielders
FC Rubin Kazan players
FC Salyut Belgorod players
FC SKA Rostov-on-Don players
Russian Premier League players
Russian Second League players